James Horton (born 1909) was an English professional footballer who played as a full back.

Career
Born in Newark, Horton signed for Bradford City in June 1933 from Newark Town, leaving the club in August 1936 to sign for Boston United. During his time with Bradford City he made three appearances in the Football League.

Sources

References

1909 births
Date of death missing
English footballers
Newark Town F.C. players
Bradford City A.F.C. players
Boston United F.C. players
English Football League players
Association football fullbacks